The 1996 Swedish Touring Car Championship season was the inaugural season of the championship. It was decided in twelve races over five race weekends held at five different circuits.

Jan Nilsson was the first championship winner of the STCC.

Teams and Drivers

Race calendar and winners
All rounds were held in Sweden.

Drivers Championship
Points were awarded to the top ten drivers in a race as follows: 20, 15, 12, 10, 8, 6, 4, 3, 2, 1.
5 points were awarded to any driver who took part in qualifying. 
Results in Race 1 decide the Race 2 grid.
Only a driver's best seven results, prior to the final meeting, were valid for the championship - total points scored are shown in brackets.
The final meeting of the year saw double points awarded.

References

External links
 Touring-cars.net
 1996 Entry List

Swedish Touring Car Championship seasons
Swedish Touring Car Championship
Swedish Touring Car Championship season